Farzad Fattahi (Persian:فرزاد فتاحی born ِDecember 22, 1980) is an Iranian songwriter, documentary maker and TV Producer. Throughout his career, he collaborated with many musicians. He began his activity with Radio Tehran at age 16 with the title of "Tehran at the Night (Persian: تهران در شب)" by  Hamid Ameli.

Education 
– Diploma of Experimenal Sciences

– Bachelor of Italian Language

– Graduated of Computer Graphic Animation

– BFA in Albertina Academy of Fine Arts of Turin, Italy

Art activities 
He collaborated with singers such as Dariush Eghbali, Faramarz Aslani, Hassan Shamaizadeh, Mehdi Yarrahi, Farzad Farzin, Mohsen Yeganeh, Mani Rahnama, Nima Masiha, Ali Lohrasbi, Behnam Safavi, Khashayar Etemadi, Mehdi Yaghmaei and Ali Ashabi.

Other activities 
Sound Designer, Video Editor, VFX Artist, Tutor of Music and Video Software, at Tehran Institute of Technology.

Television Works 
He began his activities in IRIB TV in 2004. The "Yesterday, Today, Tomorrow (Persian: دیروز، امروز، فردا)" and "Backpacks (Persian: کوله‌پشتی)" programs have been released with the voice of Farzad Fattahi.

Farzad Fatahi started working at Radio Free Europe (Radio Farda) in October 2017 as a voice actor in the radio program "Tomorrow Station" along with Farshid Manafi. He then joined Iran International TV.

Collaboration with poets 
Ardalan Sarfaraz, Ali Moallem, Afshin Yadollahi, Roozbeh Bamani, Masoud Azar, Babak Saahari, Taraneh Makrom.

Visual Effects 
Farzad Fattahi has been featured in the Long Way TV series (Persian: راه طولانی) directed by Reza Karimi (from episode 8 to the end), as well as in the television series Awakening (Persian: بیدار باش), directed by Ahmad Kavari (in all episodes) as the VFX Artist.

Arrest of Farzad Fattahi 
In January 2013, Farzad Fattahi was arrested with four other musicians, five reportedly charged with illegal production and distribution of underground music for Los Angeles satellite channels.

Immigration 
Farzad Fattahi immigrated from Iran to Italy in August 2016 and then moved to Prague in the Czech Republic. He now lives in London.

References

Iranian composers
Living people
Iranian songwriters
21st-century Iranian male singers
1980 births
Iranian music arrangers